Law Glacier is a glacier about  wide between the south end of the Queen Elizabeth Range and the MacAlpine Hills, gradually descending east-northeast from the Antarctic polar plateau to Bowden Névé. It was named by the New Zealand party of the Commonwealth Trans-Antarctic Expedition (1956–58) for B.R. Law, Deputy-Chairman of the Ross Sea Committee.

References

Glaciers of the Ross Dependency
Shackleton Coast